Castle of San Sebastián may refer to:
 Castle of San Sebastián (Cádiz)
 Castle of San Sebastián (Vigo)